Mykhailivka is a village located in Zaporizhzhia Raion, Zaporizhzhia Oblast, Ukraine.

Until 18 July 2020, Mykhailivka was located in Vilniansk Raion. The raion was abolished in July 2020 as part of the administrative reform of Ukraine, which reduced the number of raions of Zaporizhzhia Oblast to five.The area of Vilniansk Raion was merged into Zaporizhzhia Raion.

References

Zaporizhzhia Raion
Villages in Zaporizhzhia Raion